Kyōto 5th district is a constituency of the House of Representatives in the Diet of Japan (national legislature). It is located in Kyōto and covers the northwestern part of the prefecture on the Sea of Japan 

coast. The district consists of the cities of Fukuchiyama, Maizuru, Ayabe, Miyazu and Kyōtango as well as the Yosa District. As of 2012, 254,636 eligible voters were registered in the district.

Before the electoral reform of 1994, the area was part of Kyōto 2nd district where five Representatives had been elected by single non-transferable vote.

From the creation of the district until 2017, the representative for the 5th district was Sadakazu Tanigaki (LDP, Tanigaki→Koga faction) who had previously represented the old 2nd district since his father's death in 1983. In 2009, the 5th district was the only district in Kyōto the LDP could defend against the landslide for Yukio Hatoyama's Democratic Party. Tanigaki's Democratic challenger Mai Ohara lost the district by 7,000 votes but easily won a seat on the Kinki PR list. After the election that swept the LDP from power, Tanigaki was elected LDP president. During his term the opposition won a majority in the 2010 House of Councillors election. After one term, he did not run for re-election as party president. In the 2012 House of Representatives election that brought devastating results for the Democratic Party at record low turnout nationwide, Tanigaki lost only few votes and clearly defended his district seat. Tanigaki injured his spinal cord in a bicycle accident in July 2016, and remained hospitalized as of September 2017; he decided not to run in the 2017 general election due to his physical condition.

Areas Covered

Current District 
As of 5 January 2023, the areas covere by the district are as follows:

 Fukuchiyama
 Maizuru
 Ayabe
 Miyazu
 Kyōtango
 Yosa District

In 2004, the districts of Naka, Takeno and Kumano merged to form the city of Kyōtango. Amata District dissapeared when the last of its towns merged into Fukuchiyama in 2006

Areas from before 2013 
From its creation in 1994 until redistricting in 2013, the areas covered by this district were as follows:

 Fukuchiyama
 Maizuru
 Ayabe
 Miyazu
 Amata District
 Kasa District
 Yosa District
 Naka District
 Takeno District
 Kumano District

List of representatives

Election results

References 

Politics of Kyoto Prefecture
Districts of the House of Representatives (Japan)